Bone Black may refer to:
 Bone Black: Memories of Girlhood, an account of author bell hooks growing up, written in 1996
 Bone Black (2019 novel), a novel about vengeance
 The pigment bone char is also known as bone black